INS Vijeta (K84) (Victor)  was a  of the Indian Navy.

References

Vidyut-class missile boats
Fast attack craft of the Indian Navy

Naval ships of India